1989 in philosophy

Events

Publications 
 Roger Penrose, The Emperor's New Mind
 Richard Rorty, Contingency, Irony, and Solidarity
 Peter Sloterdijk, Infinite Mobilization (Eurotaoismus)
 Charles Taylor, Sources of the Self
 Slavoj Žižek, The Sublime Object of Ideology

Deaths 
 June 27 - A. J. Ayer (born 1910)
 July 2 - Wilfrid Sellars (born 1912) 
 July 27 - Dolf Sternberger (born 1907)

References 

Philosophy
20th-century philosophy
Philosophy by year